Romo may refer to:
Romo, the 1990s musical and nightclubbing movement
Romo (surname), a list of people
Daniela Romo, stage name of Mexican singer, actress and TV hostess Teresa Presmanes Corona (born 1959)
Rømø, a Danish island
Romo Lampkin, a character from the 2003-2008 remake series Battlestar Galactica
Romo (Dune), a planet from Frank Herbert's fictional Dune universe
Romo Planitia, a plain on Saturn's moon Titan
 Reality of Missing Out, a variant of fear of missing out